Audrey Syren (born 4 September 1983) in Mulhouse is a retired French female volleyball and beach volleyball player, playing as a setter. She was part of the France women's national volleyball team.

She competed at the 2005 Mediterranean Games. On club level she played for RC Villebon 91 in 2005.

As a beach volleyball player she played together with Andrea Luge. They competed at the 2001 European Beach Volleyball Championships and 2002 European Beach Volleyball Championships.

References

External links
 
 

1983 births
Living people
Sportspeople from Mulhouse
French women's volleyball players
Place of birth missing (living people)
French beach volleyball players
Competitors at the 2005 Mediterranean Games
Mediterranean Games competitors for France